The 2011 Mississippi State Bulldogs baseball team represented Mississippi State University in the NCAA Division I baseball season of 2011. The team was coached by John Cohen, in his 12th year as a collegiate head coach, and his 3rd at Mississippi State.

Mississippi State returned to the NCAA Tournament for the first time since 2007 and after three consecutive losing seasons. They were the number 3 seed in the Atlanta Regional hosted by number 1 seed Georgia Tech. They won the Regional, winning three games straight, beating Southern Miss, 3–0, Austin Peay, 8–3, and Georgia Tech, 7–3. They advanced to the Super Regional against host Florida, where they won one game but were eliminated by losing the other two games.

They started the season unranked in the four major polls, and finished in the final polls with their highest rankings of the season.

MLB Draft

Ranking movements

Coaches

Schedule and results
For schedule and results, see the reference.

References

Mississippi State Bulldogs Baseball Team, 2011
Mississippi State Bulldogs baseball seasons
Mississippi State
Miss